Richard Nicolls (sometimes written as Nichols, 1624 – 28 May 1672) was the first English colonial governor of New York province.

Early life
Nicolls was born in 1624 in Ampthill in Bedfordshire, England.  He was the son of Francis Nicolls (1582–1624), a barrister and Member of Parliament, and Margaret (née Bruce) Nicolls (1577–1652), who were married at Abbots Langley in 1609.  His mother was a daughter of Sir George Bruce of Carnock (c. 1550–1625), a Scottish merchant who built Culross Palace, and a niece of Edward Bruce, 1st Lord Kinloss (1548–1611).

Career
He commanded a royalist troop of horse (i.e., cavalry) during the English Civil War, and on the defeat of the king went into exile. Soon after the Restoration he became Groom of the Chamber to the Duke of York.

Province of New York
Through the influence of the Duke of York, in 1664 he was appointed on a commission with Sir Robert Carr (d. 1667), George Cartwright, and Samuel Maverick, to conquer New Netherlands from the Dutch and to regulate the affairs of the New England colonies and settle disputes among them. The expedition set sail from Portsmouth on 25 May 1664, and arrived for the capture of New Amsterdam on 27 August 1664. New Amsterdam was surrendered to Nicolls on 8 September 1664. Under authority of a commission from the Duke (later King James) Nicolls assumed the position of deputy-governor of New Netherlands (New York).

He made 74th Street, beginning at the East River, the southern border patent line (which was called the "Harlem Line") of the village of Nieuw Haarlem (later, the village of Harlem); the English also renamed the village "Lancaster".

His policy was vigorous but tactful, and the transition to the new regime was made smoothly and with due regard to the interests of the conquered people. The formerly Dutch colonists were guaranteed in the possession of their property rights, their laws of inheritance, and the enjoyment of religious freedom. The English system of law and administration was at once introduced into Long Island, Staten Island and Westchester, where the English element already predominated, but the change was made much more slowly in the Dutch sections. A code of laws, known as the "Duke's Laws", drafted by the governor with the help of his secretary, and nephew, Matthias Nicolls (c. 1630–1687), and dated 12 March, was proclaimed at Hempstead, Long Island, on 1 March 1665 and continued in force until 1683; the code was compiled from the codes of the New England colonies, and it provided for trial by jury, for proportional taxation on property, for the issuance of new patents for land and for land tenure only by licence from the duke.

Return to England
Nicolls returned to England in the summer of 1668 and continued in the service of the Duke of York and was replaced by Francis Lovelace as governor. He was killed in the naval battle of Southwold Bay on 28 May 1672. His monument at Ampthill incorporates the cannonball that killed him.

References
Notes

Sources

1624 births
1672 deaths
Ampthill
Cavaliers
Governors of the Province of New York
People from Ampthill
People who died at sea
Royal Navy personnel of the Anglo-Dutch Wars
Military personnel from Bedfordshire